3T Cycling is an Italian cycle sport company. It was founded in 1961.

3T switched production to carbon-fiber composite materials and in 2008 returned to pro cycling after several years' absence.

3T debuted its first "gravel" bicycle in June 2016, and followed with their second the year after.

History
3T was founded by Mario Dedioniggi in Torino in 1961. It is located in Bergamo, near Milano, and originally known as 3TTT—Tecnologia del Tubo Torino (Torino Tube Technology).

In 1970, 3T switched production to aluminum alloy in place of steel, to cut down on weight. By the late 1990s, 3T started using carbon-fiber composites.

For the 2008 season, 3T sponsored Team CSC. The team's World Champion time trialist, Fabian Cancellara, rode it during the Tour of California. During the European season at the Giro d'Italia, CSC's team failed to win the race's opening Team Time Trial.

For the 2009 season, 3T sponsored three professional teams: Cervélo TestTeam, Garmin Slipstream, and Milram.

In 2015 the company was bought by Cervélo.

See also

 List of bicycle parts
 List of Italian companies

References

External links 

  (English)

Cycle parts manufacturers
Wheel manufacturers
Composite materials
Cycle manufacturers of Italy
Manufacturing companies established in 1961
Italian companies established in 1961
Italian brands
Companies based in Bergamo